Drozd is an active protection system (APS) developed in the Soviet Union, designed for increasing tanks' protection against anti-tank missiles and RPGs. Its chief designer, Vasily Bakalov, was awarded the Lenin Prize for his work on its development.

Drozd uses 24.5 GHz Doppler radar to detect incoming rounds travelling between 70 and 700 m/s (to avoid engaging small arms or other faster projectiles). Its computer determines when to fire a 107 mm projectile. When the incoming round is at 7 m range, the Drozd fragmentation warhead detonates, spreading 3-gram slugs to destroy the incoming round. The Drozd system was relatively complex, requiring a radar array and two launch tubes on each side of the tank turret, and a large electronics package on the turret rear.

One of Drozd's shortcomings was that it was only able to protect a 60-degree arc around the forward part of the turret. Each unit costs around $30,000, was 80 percent successful against incoming RPGs in Afghanistan, but caused too much collateral damage to surrounding troops that were dismounted from their armored vehicles.

The project was abandoned by the Army, but completed by the Soviet Naval Infantry to increase protection for about 250 older T-55 tanks in 1981–82 (newer T-72s were problematic on landing craft, due to size and weight, and $170 million Drozd development was much cheaper than a commencement of an all-new time-consuming tank design). Tanks were upgraded to T-55M standard and equipped with Drozd at the tank rebuilding plant in Lviv, Ukraine, and kept in war stores for secrecy. The rebuilt tanks were designated T-55AD, or T-55AD1 if they had the newer V-46 engine. Drozd APS was later replaced by the simpler non-APS Kontakt-5 explosive reactive armour.

Drozd was also fitted to a small number of T-62s, which were designated T-62D or, if fitted with the V-46-5M engine upgrade, T-62D-1.

Drozd was exported in small numbers to China and to an undisclosed Middle-Eastern client. It was subsequently discontinued. The Drozd-2 system was developed to give a 120-degree protection arc with more projectile launchers. It was intended to be installed on the then-upcoming T-80U main battle tanks. An even more sophisticated all-round active protection system is the Arena Active Protection System.

References

Zaloga, Steven J. and Hugh Johnson (2004) T-54 and T-55 Main Battle Tanks 1944–2004, pp. 24, 33. Oxford: Osprey. .

External links

Hard-Kill Active Defense Solutions — Defense Update article on Drozd-2
DROZD (Thrush) Active Protection System at Vasiliy Fofanov's Modern Russian Armour page
Drozd APS description (in Russian)
Active protection of tanks at armor.kiev.ua (in Russian)
Drozd active protection system at armor.kiev.ua (in Russian)
Drozd-2 active protection system at armor.kiev.ua (in Russian)

Armoured fighting vehicle equipment
Cold War weapons of the Soviet Union
Soviet inventions
Weapons countermeasures
Land active protection systems
History of the tank
KBP Instrument Design Bureau products
Military equipment introduced in the 1970s